Students for the Exploration and Development of Space (SEDS) is a non-profit international student organization whose purpose is to drive space advocacy of space exploration and development through educational and engineering projects.

History
Students for the Exploration and Development of Space was founded in 1980 at MIT by Peter Diamandis, Princeton University by Scott Scharfman, and Yale University by Richard Sorkin, and consists of an international group of high school, undergraduate, and graduate students from a diverse range of educational backgrounds who are working to promote space. SEDS is a chapter-based organization with chapters in Canada, India, Israel, Mexico, Nepal, Nigeria, Philippines, South Africa, Spain, Turkey, United Kingdom, United States, Sri Lanka and Zimbabwe. The permanent National Headquarters for SEDS-USA resides at MIT and that of SEDS-India resides at Vellore Institute of Technology. Though collaboration is frequent, each branch and chapter is independent and coordinates their own activities and projects.

1980s
SEDS was founded on September 17, 1980, primarily by Peter Diamandis, Scott Scharfman, Richard Sorkin, Robert D. Richards, and Todd B. Hawley and their first meeting was held on October 30, 1980. After the initial meetings in 1980, SEDS president Peter Diamandis wrote a letter to the editor of Omni magazine deploring the status of the space program and asking students to help make a difference. The letter, published in Omni in early 1981, attracted students from around the world to SEDS. This laid the foundations for the first SEDS international conference, held at George Washington University between July 15–19, 1982. As the decade progressed, SEDS continued to have more international conferences, which rotated among schools including George Washington University (again), University of Alabama in Huntsville, and Caltech. During the end of the decade, UKSEDS was founded at the Science Museum (London) and held their first conference at the University of Cambridge during November 25–26, 1989.

1990s

During the 1990s, SEDS continued to host a national conference each year, sometimes in conjunction with the International Space Development Conference through 1997, when the last "SEDS National Conference" was held (conferences would re-appear 7 years later as the "SEDS SpaceVision Conference"). UKSEDS continued to have national conferences at rotating locations each year. During the last years of the decade, there was a major decline in SEDS leadership and a connected drop in the number of member chapters around the United States.

2000s
In 2004, the SEDS National Conferences were re-established by MITSEDS and hosted on the campus of the Massachusetts Institute of Technology on November 11–14. The conference was renamed the SEDS SpaceVision conference and featured many speakers who would return year after year during this decade, including Loretta Hidalgo Whitesides, founder Dr. Robert Richards, Rick Tumlinson, George T. Whitesides, Robert Zubrin, and Pete Worden. The SpaceVision conference then visited University of Illinois at Urbana-Champaign (2005), University of Central Florida (2006), the Massachusetts Institute of Technology (2007), Texas A&M University (2008), University of Arizona (2009), University of Illinois at Urbana-Champaign (2010), University of Colorado at Boulder (2011), University at Buffalo (2012), Arizona State University (2013), UNC Chapel Hill (2014), Boston University (2015), Purdue (2016), University of Central Florida (2017), University of California, San Diego (2018), Arizona State University (2019), and virtually for 2020. The 2021 SpaceVision will be hosted by Rice University at Space Center Houston from November 4–6. During this time, UKSEDS continued to have one national conference each year. SEDS India, after hosting the SEDS International conference in 2007, continued with SEDS India National Conferences every year since 2009 at Vellore Institute of Technology, India. SEDS also began exploring innovative national projects such as fund-raising for a joint SEDS chapter Zero-G flight and designing an innovative national Rockoon competition modeled after the Ansari X PRIZE.

Active SEDS-USA projects

SEDS-USA organizes annual and rolling projects to engage its members in space-related activities. Two such projects are:

SEDS High-Power Rocketry Competition

This is a competition between chapters designed to challenge students in high-power rocketry. The goal of the competition is to launch a rocket, designed and built by the chapter members, to an altitude of 10,000 feet above sea-level. This competition has now successfully been running since 2011. The winner of the 2012 competition was Purdue-SEDS.

Student NewSpace Business Plan Competition

Started in 2011, this competition is co-organized with the Space Frontier Foundation and aims to provide students with a real-world experience in entrepreneurship applied to the space industry. Students are required to develop space-scalable business models that will advance the NewSpace movement and are judged by a panel of 5 experts who have had several years of experience in space entrepreneurship. The winners of the 2011 and 2012 competitions were Illinois State University and Iowa State University respectively.

International branches
SEDS is organized by country, region, and chapter. There is a large contingent of SEDS chapters in the United States, which are governed regionally and nationally by SEDS-USA. SEDS India has nine SEDS chapters under it and is headquartered at Vellore Institute of Technology. There are other national sections of SEDS across the world, notably SEDS-Canada, SEDS South Africa, UKSEDS, and SEDS Zimbabwe, which has four chapters and a junior chapter. Student leaders of the international groups convene as SEDS-Earth, the global governing body of SEDS. SEDS is an organization member of the Alliance for Space Development.

SEDS-USA

SEDS-USA is the governing body of all chapters in the United States, and is the largest and original branch of SEDS. It is overseen by a national Board of Directors, Board of Advisors and a Board of Trustees. An integral aspect of SEDS-USA is the Council of Chapters (CoC). This council consists of national representatives of each chapter and is led by the Chair of the Council of Chapters. The CoC meets via teleconference to exchange updates between individual chapters and the national board. The 2022–23 national directors of SEDS-USA are listed below.

UKSEDS

UK Students for the Exploration and Development of Space (UKSEDS) is the UK's national student space society. They support students and enthusiasts across the United Kingdom by running space projects, hosting conferences and workshops, and doing outreach to inspire and educate. They build links between different parts of the space community within the UK and internationally. Their current chair is Holly Whitehouse.

UKSEDS began in 1988, when several students who had attended International Space University (ISU)'s first Space Studies Program which was held at MIT made the decision to set up the organization in the UK. A founding conference was held in March 1989 at London's Science Museum, with a full conference at Cambridge University in November of that year.

SEDS-Canada

SEDS-Canada is a federally incorporated not-for-profit organization based in Toronto, Canada, whose mandate is to advocate for the exploration and development of space through non-partisan political advocacy, conferences, student competitions, and chapter grants. The organization was initiated in early 1981 by entrepreneur Bob Richards, and it was re-established in 2014 by a group of students from the University of Toronto and the University of Western Ontario after several years of inactivity. SEDS-Canada currently has eleven university chapters operating across the country.

As part of their advocacy goals, SEDS-Canada seeks to engage Canadian policy makers and electoral candidates at all levels of government in a multi-year effort with the aim of defending cuts to good space policy, and campaigning for new policies to ensure Canadian leadership in niche areas of space exploration and development.

SEDS-Turkey
Space Exploration and Development of Space Turkey, founded in March 2017 by Hadican Çatak at Hacettepe University, is the first and only national space and entrepreneurial organization with its 350+ active members and branches in 8 universities as of January 2019.

SEDS TR's goal is to gather all interested undergraduates, master's degree students, and doctoral students and to carry out tasks that help them improve their career prospects in their field of activity by establishing a common working platform.

In order to reach this goal, SEDS TR has been working on engineering projects, organizing events and extending its area of effect by founding SEDS organizations in universities throughout Turkey and in respect to this, SEDS is trying to make operations and work done mentioned above accessible to every other student in Turkey.

SEDS-UAE
The SEDS-UAE Chapter is based at the Our Own English High School in Abu Dhabi. This chapter was founded by a high school student, Nishirth Khandwala. Members of SEDS UAE engage themselves in various activities and programs such as the International Asteroid Search Campaign.

SEDS South Africa

SEDS-South Africa is South Africa's national student Space society, and is the governing body of all SEDS chapters in South Africa. SEDS South Africa is made up of students and young professionals in Southern Africa who are interested in Space exploration and development. This includes engaging government policymakers, amateur satellite building, model rocketry, manufacturing in Space, student and young professionals collaboration, connecting with the Space industry, ham amateur radio, analogue Space missions, Space exploration, and Space technology to benefit humankind.

SEDS South Africa facilitates the education of people about the benefits of Space, by supporting a network of interested students and young professionals, and providing opportunities to inspire them and develop their leadership skills. SEDS South Africa's founding branch is the University of Cape Town, SEDS-SA-UCT. Branches include:

 SEDS-SA-Wits, 
 SEDS-SA-UP, and 
 SEDS-SA-UCT.

SEDS India

SEDS-India is the governing body of SEDS in India with its headquarters at Vellore Institute of Technology. SEDS India was founded in 2004 by Pradeep Mohandas and Abhishek Ray. The first chapter was established in Mumbai at PIIT, New Panvel. SEDS India governs affiliated chapters in India at various universities, including Vellore Institute of Technology, Veltech University, Birla Institute of Technology & Science Pilani-Goa, Sri Ramakrishna Engineering College and SASTRA University. Chapter affairs are controlled by the Local Chapter Committee which reports to the Executive Board of SEDS India. The Executive Board of SEDS India consists of six Board Members who are selected through a voting process, with all individual members of SEDS India being eligible to vote. The Permanent Trustee of SEDS India is Geetha Manivasagam, Vellore Institute of Technology. The advisory panel has multiple dignitaries on its board, including the Associate Director of Vikram Sarabhai Space Center.

The main outreach program of SEDS India is called OneSpace. OneSpace was founded to spread awareness about and engagement with space among underprivileged children in rural India and children residing in local orphanages. Attempts have also been made by SEDS India to outreach to northeast India, where access to space education and technical projects is more difficult. These efforts were led with the help of Angaraj Duara, an alumnus of Maharishi Vidyamandir Shilpukhuri, Guwahati, and established seven chapters in Assam. They are the Army Public School Narangi, Sharla Birla Gyan Jyoti School Guwahati, IIT-Guwahati, Handique Girls College, Royal Global Institute - RSET Guwahati, Donbosco Public School Panbazar and Tezpur University. SEDS-APSN was the first chapter in northeast India. A separate SEDS-NorthEast governing body oversees activities in the northeast.

SEDS (Singapore)

SEDS (Singapore), founded in July 2019 by Vairavan Ramanathan and Nick Lee from National University of Singapore and the Nanyang Technological University respectively, is the first and only national space and entrepreneurial organization in Singapore. The goal of SEDS Singapore is to provide a platform for students of all backgrounds based in Singapore to actively participate in ushering in a new space age.

Currently, there are 3 SEDS chapters under SEDS (Singapore). NUS SEDS based in National University of Singapore. SEDS-NTU based in Nanyang Technological University. SEDS-SUTD based in Singapore University of Technology and Design.
 
Current Active Projects of SEDS (Singapore):

SEDS Sri Lanka 

The most widespread astronomy related organization in Sri Lanka, SEDS Sri Lanka provides myriad opportunities to enthusiastic school children and university undergraduates alike. Founded in September 2018 by then graduate, Amila Sandun Basnayake and undergraduate, Thilan Harshana, currently the main organization SEDS Sri Lanka governs 16 chapters established under it. Hailing from a number of government and private universities, as well as a separate chapter for school children named SEDS Juniors, a wide range of activities are carried out throughout the year.

Evolving rapidly into an island-wide platform that serves to educate, provide opportunity for participation in multi-level events, further aspirations professionally and academically, as well as an ideal method to explore all aspects related to aviation and aerospace, SEDS Sri Lanka is a perfect place for anyone to develop their interests in this field.

These opportunities are represented in many ways such as both onsite and online workshops, SEDS Space Talks, competitions and citizen scientist ventures and educational programs for juniors. Among these, it is of importance to note the first high altitude balloon launched by Sri Lanka, under the project SERENDIB 1.0, the Hackathon, NASA Space Apps conducted in collaboration with NASA, and the numerous asteroid hunts held in collaboration with Pan-STARRS.

SEDS Philippines 

SEDS Philippines (SEDSPH) is the official Philippine chapter of the Students for the Exploration and Development of Space or SEDS. It is a student-led, non-profit organization that functions to promote the idea of space exploration and space technology in the country, provide a community for students with a common interest in space, supply opportunities and networks that will enhance their skills, foster growth and confidence among them, and empower their impact in the space sector. 

To reinforce these missions, SEDSPH aims to create local and international opportunities for Filipino students in the space industry.

Macedonian SEDS

Macedonian Students for the Exploration and Development of Space (MK-SEDS / МК-СИРК) is the national and regional governing body for SEDS Chapters in Macedonia and Europe.

MK-SEDS initially started in 2019 as a self-organized and student-run Macedonian Cosmic Institute at the Ss. Cyril and Methodius University in Skopje on the initiative of few students.
On October 18, 2020, students, alumni, alumnae and youth from Ss. Cyril and Methodius University of Skopje, Goce Delchev University of Shtip and St. Kliment Ohridski University of Bitola united in their intention to represent the force of Good, Beauty and Truth in the cosmic community of planet Earth adopted the Decision for registration of the Macedonian STUDENTS FOR THE EXPLORATION AND DEVELOPMENT OF SPACE.

The permanent Headquarters for MK-SEDS resides at the Faculty of Computer Science and Engineering, Ss. Cyril and Methodius University in Skopje.

SEDS Zimbabwe

Zimbabwe has multiple SEDS chapters at its major universities namely University of Zimbabwe, National University of Science and Technology, Midlands State University and Chinhoyi University of Technology. It also has a junior SEDS chapter that is aimed at introducing space education to students in high schools. In December 2021, SEDS MSU was one of the 10 teams in the world to be part of the Global Satellite Tracking Initiative where they were recipients of equipment to set up a ground station at Midlands State University.

Notable student leaders
 Jeff Bezos, Princeton
 Eric C. Anderson, Co-Founder and Chairman of Virginia-based Space Adventures, Ltd., the first commercial spaceflight company—whilst enrolled as a student at the University of Virginia, he started a chapter of Students for the Exploration and Development of Space.

See also
 Outer space
 Yuri's Night
 Space Frontier Foundation
 National Space Society
 The Planetary Society
 Mars Society
 NewSpace
 Peter Diamandis
 Robert D. Richards
 Todd B. Hawley

References

External links
 
 Map of SEDS Chapters Worldwide
 SEDS-APSN Website

Space organizations
Astronomy organizations
Student organizations established in 1980
Space advocacy organizations
Space colonization
Human spaceflight